This article lists the heads of government of Cuba from 1940 until the present day.

Between 1940 and 1976 (under the 1940 Constitution), the role of the head of government was performed by the Prime Minister of Cuba.

Between 1976 and 2019 (under the 1976 Constitution), the position of Prime Minister was abolished and replaced by the President of the Council of Ministers.

On 24 February 2019 (under the 2019 Constitution), the position of Prime Minister was restored.

On 21 December 2019, Manuel Marrero Cruz was appointed as the new Prime Minister.

Prime Ministers of Cuba

Republic of Cuba (1902–1959)

Republic of Cuba (1959–present)

See also
Captaincy General of Cuba
United States Military Government in Cuba
Republic of Cuba (1902–1959)
List of colonial governors of Cuba
Council of State (Cuba)
President of Cuba
List of heads of state of Cuba
Vice President of Cuba
Council of Ministers (Cuba)
Prime Minister of Cuba
Guantanamo Bay Naval Base
List of commanders of Guantanamo Bay Naval Base
Lists of office-holders
List of current heads of state and government

References

External links
World Statesmen.org: profile of Cuba

.
.Heads of government, Listed
Heads of government
Cuba
Cuba
Heads of government
.
.